Four Winds the Walker is the second album by Spires That in the Sunset Rise, released in 2005.

Track listing
"Four Winds" – 1:18
"Wide Awake" – 4:14
"Little for a Lot" – 4:21
"Sheye" – 5:32
"Sort Sands" – 5:28
"Ong Song" – 5:54
"This Aint for Mama" – 8:09
"Shining" – 4:02
"No Matter" – 5:32
"Imaginary Skin" – 3:50
"Serum" – 6:47
"The May Ham" – 4:16
"Born in a Room" – 4:15
"The Walker" – 1:17

2005 albums